Foreign & Colonial Eurotrust is a large British investment trust dedicated to investments in companies operating in Continental Europe. Established in 1972, the company is a former constituent of the FTSE 250 Index.

The fund is managed by F&C Asset Management.

References
  Official site

Investment trusts of the United Kingdom